Eslam Qaleh (also Romanized as Eslām Qal‘eh; also known as Kāfer Qal‘eh) is a village in Khangiran Rural District, in the Central District of Sarakhs County, Razavi Khorasan Province, Iran. At the 2006 census, its population was 665, in 156 families.

References 

Populated places in Sarakhs County